Lot and His Daughters is a 1633 oil on canvas painting of Lot and his daughters by the French artist Simon Vouet, now in the Musée des Beaux-Arts de Strasbourg.

It depicts the Book of Genesis story in which, after the destruction of Sodom by divine judgment, Lot and his daughters take refuge in a cave. They, believing that there are no men with whom to have offspring, drunk his father and commit incest with him, one each night, subsequently becoming pregnant.

The subject, judged as shameful in the Middle Ages, was not explicitly represented, but since the Renaissance it became more usual, due to the opportunity it offered to artists to apply various degrees of eroticism.

References

External links

Loth et ses filles , presentation on the museum's website
http://www.historia-del-arte-erotico.com/lot/home.htm

Vouet
1633 paintings
Paintings in the collection of the Musée des Beaux-Arts de Strasbourg
Paintings by Simon Vouet